Kolganov is a Russian masculine surname, its feminine counterpart is Kolganova. It may refer to
Andrey Kolganov (born 1974), Kazakhstani fencer
Michael Kolganov (born 1974), Israeli sprint canoer 
Mikhail Kolganov (athlete) (born 1980), Kazakhstani middle-distance runner 

Russian-language surnames